The 12465/12466 Ranthambhore Express is a Superfast train service which runs between  railway station in Indore, the largest city and the commercial hub of the central Indian state Madhya Pradesh, and Jodhpur, a major city in Rajasthan, India. It is operated with 12465/12466 train numbers on a daily basis.

Coach composition

The train consists of 17 coaches:

 1 AC Chair Car
 3 AC III Tier
 2 Sleeper coaches
 3 2nd Seating
 6 General Unreserved
 2 End-On Generator

Service

12465/ Indore–Jodhpur Ranthambhore Express has an average speed of 55 km/hr and covers 910.1 km in 16 hrs 35 mins.
12466/Jodhpur–Indore Ranthambhore Express has an average speed of 55 km/hr and covers 910.1 km in 16 hrs 35 mins.

Route and halts 
The important halts of the train are:

Schedule

Rake sharing 
The train shares its rake with 14801/14802 Jodhpur–Indore Express.

Direction reversal
The train reverses its direction two times at:

Traction

After Sawai Madhopur Junction, both trains are hauled by a Bhagat Ki Kothi-based WDP-4 / WDP-4B / WDP-4D diesel locomotive up to Jodhpur Junction, and vice versa.

See also
 Jodhpur–Indore Express
 Indore–Jaipur Superfast Express
 Indore–Ajmer Link Express
 Bhopal–Jodhpur Passenger

References

Rail transport in Madhya Pradesh
Transport in Jodhpur
Transport in Indore
Rail transport in Rajasthan
Express trains in India
Named passenger trains of India